Nicholas Jubber is a British travel writer. He was educated at Downside School and Oxford University. After obtaining a degree in English, he taught in Jerusalem. He has travelled throughout South America, Europe, the Middle East and East Africa. He has worked as a journalist and is also a produced playwright; one of his plays was staged at the Edinburgh Festival.

He has written four books: 
 The Prester Quest (winner of the Dolman Prize)
 Drinking Arak Off an Ayatollah’s Beard (nominated for the Dolman Prize)
 The Timbuktu School for Nomads 
 Epic Continent (nominated for the Dolman Prize)

References

English writers
Year of birth missing (living people)
Living people
Alumni of the University of Oxford